Leader of Government Business or Leader of the House may refer to:
 Leader of the House (Australia)
 Manager of Government Business in the Senate, the upper house equivalent in the federal parliament
 Leader of the House (Queensland), Australia
 Leader of Government Business in the House of Assembly (South Australia)
 Leader of Government Business in the Legislative Council (South Australia)
 Leader of the House in the Victorian Legislative Assembly
 Leader of the Government in the Victorian Legislative Council
 Leader of the House (Bangladesh)
 Leader of the Government in the House of Commons (Canada)
 Leader of Government Business of the Cayman Islands, now known as Premier
 Leader of the House (Lok Sabha), India
 Leader of the House (Rajya Sabha), India
 Leader of the House (New Zealand)
 Leader of Government Business in the National Assembly of South Africa
 Leader of the House (Sri Lanka)
 Leader of the House of Commons, United Kingdom
 Leader of the House of Lords, United Kingdom
 Minister and Leader of the House of Commons, Northern Ireland, United Kingdom
 Leader of the Seanad, Ireland
 Leader of the Senate of Northern Ireland, United Kingdom